Moosa Jatt is a 2021 Indian Punjabi language action film which was written by Gurinder Dimpy, produced by Rrupaali Gupta and directed by Tru Makers. It stars Sidhu Moose Wala and Sweetaj Brar in lead roles. The film was theatrically released on October 8, 2021.

Cast 
 Sidhu Moose Wala as ‘‘Moosa’’
 Sweetaj Brar as ‘‘Rani”
 Mahabir Bhullar as “Jang Singh” (Uncle of Moosa)	
 Tarsem Paul aa “Sangha”	
 Bhana Sidhu as “Bhau”
 Gurinder Dimpy as “Kahan Singh”
 Yaad Grewal as 
 Sanju Solanki as “Sham Lal”
 Surinder Bath as “Rehmat Taya”
 Sameep Singh Ranaut as “Moosa”
 Pardeep Brar as “Inspector Brar”
 Harkirat Singh as “Tochi”
 Sukh Dandiwal as “Pastaul”
 Kulveer Mushkabaad as “Pala Singh”
 Manjinder Makha as “Gela”

Production 
On November 12, 2020, Sidhu Moosewala and Whole team announced the film MoosaJatt through Social Media and filming began from December 2020. Originally intended for a 18 June 2021 release, it was postponed due to the ongoing COVID-19 pandemic. This was Sidhu Moose Wala's final film before his assassination on 29 May 2022.

Release 
The film was met with censorship issues in India, ultimately cancelling its release in India. It was nonetheless released worldwide, including the United States, the United Kingdom, Canada and France. On 1 October 2021, it was granted theatrical distribution in India.

Soundtrack 

On 1 September 2021, The Label Times Music released the first track, "Jailaan", performed by Sidhu Moose Wala itself and produced by The Kidd. A second single, "Ikk Duje De", was officially released on all platforms on 7 September as a promotion track.

References

External links
 

Punjabi-language Indian films